The Prince of Peremyshl was the ruler of the Principality of Peremyshl, a city-state in medieval Rus'. the following is a list of its princes:

Notes

References
 
 
 

Peremyshl